This is a list of rivers in the U.S. state of South Carolina:

By drainage basin
This list is arranged by drainage basin, from north to south, with respective tributaries indented under each larger stream's name. All rivers in South Carolina drain to the Atlantic Ocean.

 Little River
 Pee Dee River
 Old Dead River
 Sampit River
 Black River
 Black Mingo Creek
 Pocotaligo River
 Little Pee Dee River
 Lumber River
 Lynches River
 Little River
 Jeffries Creek
 Black Creek

 Santee River (North Santee River and South Santee River are distributaries)
 Little River
 Wateree River
 Catawba River
 Fishing Creek
 Congaree River
 Dead River
 Old Dead River
 Broad River
 Little River
 Enoree River
 Tyger River
 Fairforest Creek
 North Tyger River
 Middle Tyger River
 South Tyger River
 Sandy River
 Little Sandy River
 Pacolet River
 Lawsons Fork Creek
 North Pacolet River
 South Pacolet River
 Saluda River
 Little Saluda River
 Bush River
 Little River
 Reedy River
 North Saluda River
 Middle Saluda River
 South Saluda River
 Oolenoy River
 Gills Creek

 Wando River
 Cooper River
 Back River
 Ashley River
 Stono River
 Kiawah River

 Edisto River (North Edisto River and South Edisto River are distributaries)
 Four Holes Swamp
 North Fork Edisto River
 Bull Swamp Creek
 South Fork Edisto River
 Little River
 Ashepoo River
 Combahee River
 Little Salkehatchie River
 Salkehatchie River
 Coosaw River
 Morgan River (SC)
 Story River
 Beaufort River
 Broad River
 Colleton River
 Pocotaligo River
 Coosawhatchie River
 May River
 New River
 Wright River

 Savannah River
 Stevens Creek
 Little River
 Rocky River
 Seneca River
 Keowee River
 Little River
 Flat Shoals River
 Toxaway River
 Horsepasture River
 Whitewater River
 Thompson River
 Tugaloo River
 Chauga River
 Chattooga River
 East Fork Chattooga River

Alphabetically

Ashepoo River
Ashley River
Back River 
Bates Old River
Beaufort River
Black River
Black Mingo Creek
Broad River (northern)
Broad River (southern)
Bull Swamp Creek
Bush River
Catawba River
Chattooga River
Chauga River
Chechessee River
Combahee River
Colleton River
Congaree River
Cooper River (incl. East & West Branches, and Back River)
Coosaw River
Coosawhatchie River
Dead River
East Fork Chatooga River
Edisto River (incl. North & South Forks)
Enoree River
Flat Shoals River
Four Holes Swamp
Gills Creek
Great Pee Dee River
Harbor River
Horsepasture River
Keowee River
Little Lynches River
Little Pee Dee River
Little River (Broad River tributary)
Little River (Edisto River tributary)
Little River (Horry County, South Carolina)
Little River (Lynches River tributary)
Little River (McCormick County, South Carolina)
Little River (Oconee County, South Carolina)
Little River (Saluda River tributary)
Little River (Santee River tributary)
Little Salkehatchie River
Little Saluda River
Little Sandy River
Lumber River
Lynches River
May River
Morgan River (SC)
New River
Oolenoy River
Okatee River
Old Dead River (Marlboro County)
Old Dead River (Richland County, Congaree National Park)
Pacolet River (incl. North, South, and Lawson's Fork Creek)
Pocotaligo River (Black River tributary)
Pocotaligo River (Broad River tributary)
Reedy River
Rocky River
Salkehatchie River
Saluda River (incl. North, Middle, and South Forks)
Sampit River
Sandy River
Santee River (incl. North & South)
Savannah River
Seneca River
Stevens Creek
Stono River
Story River
Thompson River
Toxaway River
Tugaloo River
Tyger River (incl. North, Middle, and South)
Waccamaw River
Wando River
Wateree River
Whitewater River
Wright River

See also

List of rivers in the United States
List of lakes in South Carolina

References 
USGS Geographic Names Information Service
USGS Hydrologic Unit Map - State of South Carolina (1974)

South Carolina
 
Rivers